Juan Antiga Escobar (August 23, 1871 - February 9, 1939) was a  Cuban baseball player, physician, homeopath, government official, and diplomat, who served as an ambassador to France and Switzerland, delegate to the League of Nations, and Secretary of Labor under President Carlos Mendieta. He served as Secretary of Labor for about one month before resigning on March 2, 1934 over a disagreement with Mendieta's labor policies. 

He played for Habana from 1890 to 1892 and was named to the Cuban Baseball Hall of Fame in 1948.

References

Notes

People from Yaguajay
Cuban League players
Cuban diplomats
Ambassadors to Switzerland
Ambassadors of Cuba to France
Cuban physicians
Habana players
1871 births
1939 deaths